Auguste André Coussillan (31 July 1886 – 15 April 1984) was a French historian specialising in the history of Paris. Under the pen-name Jacques Hillairet he wrote two major reference works on the subject in the 1950s - Connaissance du vieux Paris and Dictionnaire historique des rues de Paris.

Works 
 Évocation du vieux Paris. Vieux Quartiers, vieilles rues, vieilles demeures, historique, vestiges, annales et anecdotes, 3 vol., Minuit, 1951-1954
[1] Le Paris du Moyen Âge et de la Renaissance. Le Cœur de Paris [2] Les Faubourgs [3] Les Villages de Paris
 Saint-Germain l'Auxerrois, église collégiale royale et paroissiale, l'église, la paroisse, le quartier, avec Maurice Baurit, Minuit, 1955
 Le Palais du Louvre, sa vie, ses grands souvenirs historiques, Minuit, 1955 ; 1961
 Connaissance du vieux Paris, Le Club français du livre, 1956 ; 3 vol., Gonthier, 1963 ; Le Club français du livre, 1965 à 1976 ; Éditions Princesse, 1978 ; Payot/Rivages, 1993 ; Rivages/Poche, 2005
[1] Rive droite [2] Rive gauche [3] Les Îles et les Villages
 Gibets, piloris et cachots du vieux Paris, Minuit, 1956 ; 1989
 Les 200 Cimetières du vieux Paris, Minuit, 1958
 Dictionnaire historique des rues de Paris, 2 vol., Minuit, 1963 ; 1985 ; 2004
 Le Palais royal et impérial des Tuileries et son jardin, Minuit, 1965
 Charonne, notre quartier, avec Lucien Lambeau, Étiolles, 1965
 La Rue de Richelieu, Minuit, 1966
 Les Musées d'art de Paris, avec Raymond Cogniat, Aimery Somogy, 1967
 L'Île Saint-Louis, rue par rue, maison par maison, Minuit, 1967
 L'Île de la Cité, Minuit, 1969
 La Rue Saint-Antoine, Minuit, 1970 ; 1988
 Le Douzième Arrondissement, Minuit, 1972
 Les Mazarinettes, ou les Sept Nièces de Mazarin, Minuit, 1976
 La Colline de Chaillot, Minuit, 1977
 Le Village d'Auteuil, Minuit, 1978

External links 
http://www.leseditionsdeminuit.com/f/index.php?sp=liv&livre_id=2117

History of Paris
20th-century French historians
Local historians
People from Allier
1886 births
1984 deaths
Burials at Père Lachaise Cemetery
20th-century French male writers
French male non-fiction writers